The Warsaw Gay Movement (abbreviated: WRH) – was one of the first openly lesbian and gay organizations in Poland; it operated in Warsaw between 1987 and 1988. The Warsaw Gay Movement was started in 1987, initially only for gay men. The founders were a group of activists, led by Waldemar Zboralski, Sławomir Starosta and Krzysztof Garwatowski. However, lesbian women began joining the group during its first month of activity.

The creation of the WRH was a counter-reaction by Polish gays against Operation Hyacinth, an anti-gay program started by Polish police in November 1985.

The first activities of WRH focused on AIDS prevention and encouraging gay people to obtain HIV tests. The reaction of the Polish mainstream media to the existence of the Warsaw Gay Movement was positive. WRH activists had an opportunity to present they opinions in weekly newspapers, and on radio and Polish television. The Polish journalists were at the time on the side of Polish lesbian and gays and supported them openly.

The Warsaw Gay Movement was mentioned under the name "Warsaw Homosexual Movement" as a politically active group of the Polish independence movement, by Radio Free Europe analyst Jiří Pehe, in his survey published in 1988 and 1989.

In March 1988 the group of 15 activists applied to Warsaw City Hall and filed a formal application to register the Warsaw Gay Movement based on the Associations Act. The Polish government refused it, due to an intervention from general Czesław Kiszczak, minister of Home Affairs, and the decision – influenced by the Catholic Church – was negative on the grounds: "The existence of such an organisation is against the rule of public morality". The group continued its activity in 1988 and in 1990, after communism in Poland had fallen, members of the Warsaw Gay Movement participated in the creation of a new organisation called "Stowarzyszenie Grup Lambda" (en: Lambda Groups Association), an LGBT organisation with wider aims.

References 

LGBT rights in Poland
LGBT history in Poland
LGBT organisations in Poland
1987 establishments in Poland
Organizations established in 1987
Mermen